Bernadini can mean:

 Bernardini (horse), thoroughbred race horse, at Darley Stable in Kentucky
 Bernardini (company), safe manufacturer which operated from 1912 to 1992
 Bernardini (surname), family name of Italian origin

See also 

 Bernardin
 Bernardoni